The FIBT World Championships 1950 took place in Cortina d'Ampezzo, Italy for the third time after hosting the event previously in 1937 (Two-man) and 1939 (Four-man).

Two man bobsleigh

Four man bobsleigh

Medal table

References
2-Man bobsleigh World Champions
4-Man bobsleigh World Champions

IBSF World Championships
Sport in Cortina d'Ampezzo
1950 in bobsleigh
International sports competitions hosted by Italy
Bobsleigh in Italy 
1937 in Italian sport